Almut Lehmann (married name: Peyper) (born 10 June 1953 in Stuttgart) is a German former pair skater who competed for West Germany.

With partner Herbert Wiesinger,  she is a three-time German national champion and 1973 European bronze medalist. They placed 5th at the 1972 Winter Olympics. They represented the club SC Rießersee.

Following her retirement from competitive skating, she skated professionally with the Ice Capades.

Competitive highlights
 with Wiesinger

References

 
 ISU statistics

1953 births
Living people
Sportspeople from Stuttgart
German female pair skaters
Figure skaters at the 1972 Winter Olympics
Olympic figure skaters of West Germany
European Figure Skating Championships medalists